Guro Strøm Solli (born July 29, 1983) is a Norwegian cross-country skier who has competed since 2003. Her best World Cup finish was second in a team sprint event in Germany in 2005. Solli finished tenth in the sprint event at the FIS Nordic World Ski Championships 2005 in Oberstdorf. 

A classical 300-meter rollerski race was on the agenda at the Norwegian national team’s training camp in Klekken/Hønefoss. The event was held Thursday night and 2000 spectators showed up for the downtown race despite bad weather.
The race included qualification heat, semifinal and finale. Solli won the women’s event ahead of Marit Bjørgen and Ella Gjømle Berg.

Cross-country skiing results
All results are sourced from the International Ski Federation (FIS).

World Championships

World Cup

Season standings

Individual podiums

2 podiums

Team podiums

 1 podium – (1 )

References

External links

1983 births
Living people
Norwegian female cross-country skiers
Sportspeople from Bodø